Sylvia Cheeseman (born 19 May 1929) is a retired English sprinter. Competing in relays, she won two medals at the 1950 British Empire Games and one at the 1952 Olympics. Individually she was eliminated in the 200 m at the 1948 Olympics and in the 1952 Olympics she won her heat but was eliminated in the semi-final.  She won the Amateur Athletic Association of England title in this event in 1946–1949 and 1951–1952, placing second in 1950.

Cheeseman's mother was a concert pianist, her father was a double bass player and a founding member of the Royal Philharmonic Orchestra, and her sister was an international model. In 1957 she married the Olympic runner John Disley; they had two daughters. After retiring from competitions, she worked as a freelance journalist in China and all around Europe.

References

1929 births
Living people
Athletes (track and field) at the 1950 British Empire Games
Commonwealth Games bronze medallists for England
English female sprinters
British female sprinters
Olympic bronze medallists for Great Britain
Athletes (track and field) at the 1952 Summer Olympics
Olympic athletes of Great Britain
Commonwealth Games medallists in athletics
Athletes (track and field) at the 1948 Summer Olympics
Medalists at the 1952 Summer Olympics
Olympic bronze medalists in athletics (track and field)
Olympic female sprinters
Medallists at the 1950 British Empire Games